Astragalus bylowae, Bylov's milkvetch, is a species of milkvetch that is endemic to a single area around Tegh in Armenia. It can be found on steppe-covered slopes at about 1,400 m elevation. It can be differentiated from the related A. ornithopodioides by the shape of its pods and leaflets and very short calyx teeth. It differs from A. glochideus by its smaller calyx. It is threatened by agricultural expansion and nomadic livestock farming.

References

bylowae
Endemic flora of Armenia
Critically endangered plants